Mohammed Al Thani may refer to any people in House of Thani, or people with Mohammed given name and Al Thani as clan name.

Mohammed bin Hamad bin Khalifa Al Thani, brother of the current Emir (ruler) of Qatar.
Mohammed bin Hamad bin Abdullah Al Thani, Qatari politician and ambassador.
Muhammed bin Jassim Al Thani, ruler of Qatar 1913–1914.
Mohammed bin Abdulla Al Thani, (born 1982), Qatari businessman and mountaineer.

bin Mohammed Al Thani also part of the surname, means son of Mohammed, descendant of Thani, may refer to:
Jassim bin Mohammed Al Thani (1825–1913), the founder of the state of Qatar
Saud bin Muhammed Al Thani (1966–2014), art collector, Qatari minister of Culture, Arts and Heritage

See also
Mohammed bin Thani